Mount Meunier is a mountain rising to  near the northeast end of the Kohler Range, Antarctica,  east of Mount Strange. The northern slopes of the feature are partly ice free and overlook Dotson Ice Shelf on the Walgreen Coast of Marie Byrd Land. It was mapped by the United States Geological Survey (USGS) from surveys and U.S. Navy aerial photographs, 1959–67, and was named by the Advisory Committee on Antarctic Names in 1977 after Tony Kenneth Meunier, a cartographer and physical scientist with the USGS from 1972. Meunier was a member of the USGS satellite surveying team at South Pole Station, winter party, 1974, and a member of the ANSMET team in the Allan Hills area, 1982–83, initiating a plan for positioning, by satellite surveying methods, the location of meteorites discovered in field operations. From 1991 he worked in the Polar Programs Section of the Office of International Activities at the USGS.

References

Mountains of Marie Byrd Land